This is a list of museums in Thailand.

See also
 List of provinces of Thailand
 List of natural history museums in Thailand
 Tourism in Thailand
 Culture of Thailand

Museums
List
Thailand
Museums
Museums
Thailand